Matteo Tagliariol (born 7 January 1983, in Treviso) is an Italian right-handed épée fencer, 2008 team Olympic bronze medalist, and 2008 individual Olympic champion.

His fencing style has been described as "technical, simple, spontaneous, clear-sighted, inspired and efficient".

Medal Record

Olympic Games

World Championship

European Championship

Grand Prix

World Cup

Record Against Selected Opponents
Includes results from all competitions 2006–present and athletes who have reached the quarterfinals at the World Championships or Olympic Games, plus those who have medaled in major team competitions.

  José Luis Abajo 2-0
  Silvio Fernández 3-1
  Stefano Carozzo 3-0
  Marcel Fischer 2-0
  Géza Imre 0-1
  Jérôme Jeannet 1-2
  Radosław Zawrotniak 1-0
  Dmytro Chumak 2-0
  Diego Confalonieri 0-1
  Weston Kelsey 1-0
  Maksym Khvorost 1-0
  Krisztián Kulcsár 1-0
  Alfredo Rota 1-1
  Wang Lei 1-0
  Anton Avdeev 0-1
  Sturla Torkildsen 2-0
  Bas Verwijlen 1-0
  Joaquim Videira 1-0
  Gábor Boczkó 1-0
  Martin Schmitt 0-1

References

External links
 

1983 births
Italian male épée fencers
Fencers at the 2008 Summer Olympics
Olympic fencers of Italy
Olympic gold medalists for Italy
Olympic bronze medalists for Italy
Sportspeople from Treviso
Living people
Fencers of Centro Sportivo Aeronautica Militare
Medalists at the 2008 Summer Olympics
Mediterranean Games silver medalists for Italy
Mediterranean Games medalists in fencing
Competitors at the 2009 Mediterranean Games
Olympic medalists in fencing
Mediterranean Games bronze medalists for Italy
Competitors at the 2022 Mediterranean Games